Landry Ndikumana (born 14 February 1995) is a Burundian basketball player for Urunani and the Burundi national team.

Career
Ndikumana started his career with Burundian team Urunani and impressed in the FIBA Zone V Championships, winning MVP twice in a row. 

From 2015, Ndikumana played for the City Oilers in Uganda and has been one of the most prominent players on the team. Ndikumana garnered regular season MVP honours in 2017, and won Playoffs MVP in 2018.

In October 2021, he was on the roster of New Star BBC on loan from Urunani for the 2022 BAL Qualifying Tournaments.

References

External links
Landry Ndikumana at Afrobasket.com
Landry Ndikumana at RealGM

1995 births
Living people
Burundian basketball players
Burundian expatriate sportspeople in Uganda
Small forwards
City Oilers players
New Star BBC players
20th-century Burundian people
21st-century Burundian people
Urunani BBC players